The Plant City High School is a public high school in Plant City, Florida, United States and is part of the Hillsborough County Public Schools. The current school building was completed in 1972 on Maki Road, now called Raider Place.

History

The original school is located at 605 North Collins Street. It was built in 1914 and designed by Tampa-based architect Willis R. Biggers. The original building now houses a community center and historical society and was added to the U.S. National Register of Historic Places on February 4, 1981.

School
In May 2006, Plant City High School was recognized as one of the top 1000 high schools in America by Newsweek magazine. Advance placement examination participation at PCHS has tripled since 2000, the largest increase in the district. Nearly 20% of the 2006 graduates passed an AP exam while in high school. Seven of the teachers are Nationally Board Certified.

The current principal is Mrs. Susan Sullivan.

Improvement
Plant City was one of 16 schools nationwide selected by the College Board for inclusion in the EXCELerator School Improvement Model program beginning the 2007–2008 school year. The project was funded by the Bill & Melinda Gates Foundation.

Notable alumni
 Arthur Cox, former NFL player
 Derrick Gainer, former NFL player
Ashley Moody, thirty-eighth Attorney General of Florida
 Clay Roberts, soccer player and coach
 Kenny Rogers (1982), Major League Baseball pitcher

References

External links
 

National Register of Historic Places in Hillsborough County, Florida
High schools in Hillsborough County, Florida
Public high schools in Florida
1914 establishments in Florida
Educational institutions established in 1914
Plant City, Florida